Lysyl oxidase (LOX), also known as protein-lysine 6-oxidase, is an enzyme that, in humans, is encoded by the LOX gene. It catalyzes the conversion of lysine molecules into highly reactive aldehydes that form cross-links in extracellular matrix proteins. Its inhibition can cause osteolathyrism,  but, at the same time, its upregulation by tumor cells may promote metastasis of the existing tumor, causing it to become malignant and cancerous.

Structure 

In the yeast strain Pichia pastoris, lysyl oxidase constitutes a homodimeric structure. Each monomer consists of an active site that includes a Cu(II) atom coordinated with three histidine residues as well as 2,4,5-trihydroxyphenalanine quinone (TPQ), a crucial cofactor.

In humans, the LOX gene is located on chromosome 5 q23.3-31.2. The DNA sequence encodes a polypeptide of 417 amino acids, the first 21 residues of which constitute a signal peptide, with a weight of approximately 32 kDa. The carboxyterminus contains the active copper (II) ion, lysine, tyrosine, and cysteine residues that comprise the catalytically active site. The three-dimensional structure of human lysyl oxidase has not yet been resolved.

Mechanism 

The mechanism of lysyl oxidase occurs via modification of the ε-amino group of a lysine side chain.  The enzyme falls into the category of quinone-containing copper amine oxidases, and the reaction is highly dependent on the cofactor lysyl tyrosylquinone (LTQ). The LTQ cofactor is unique among quinones due to its ortho/benzoquinone structure and neutral charge under physiological pH. This can be contrasted with the similar ubiquitous quinocofactor TPQ, which exists as a negatively charged structure under physiological conditions and includes ortho/para-carbonyl resonance functionality.

LTQ is crucial in LOX-catalyzed conversion of lysine residues to α-aminoadipidic-δ-semialdehydes, generally referred to as allysines. In the oxidation of lysine, the ε-amine is first converted to a Schiff base via reaction with LTQ. While LTQ is still bound to the substrate, rate-limiting removal of the ε-proton yields an imine intermediate. Subsequent hydrolysis of the imine leads to release of the aldehyde product, allysine. Molecular oxygen and the copper ion are utilized to reoxidize the cofactor and yield another imine, producing hydrogen peroxide as a side product. Additional hydrolysis releases ammonia and the original cofactor, completing the catalytic cycle.

Biological function 
Lysyl oxidase is an extracellular copper-dependent enzyme that catalyzes formation of aldehydes from lysine residues in collagen and elastin precursors. These aldehydes are highly reactive, and undergo spontaneous chemical reactions with other lysyl oxidase-derived aldehyde residues, or with unmodified lysine residues. This results in cross-linking collagen and elastin, which is essential for stabilization of collagen fibrils and for the integrity and elasticity of mature elastin.

Complex cross-links are formed in collagen (pyridinolines derived from three lysine residues) and in elastin (desmosines derived from four lysine residues) that differ in structure.

The importance of lysyl oxidase-derived cross-linking was established from animal studies in which lysyl oxidase was inhibited either by nutritional copper-deficiency or by supplementation of diets with β-aminopropionitrile (BAPN), an inhibitor of lysyl oxidase. This resulted in lathyrism, characterized by poor bone formation and strength, hyperextensible skin, weak ligaments, and increased occurrence of aortic aneurysms. These abnormalities correlated well with decreased cross-linking of collagen and elastin.

Developmentally, reduced lysyl oxidase levels have been implicated in Menkes disease and occipital horn syndrome, two X-linked recessive disorders characterized by a mutation in a gene for copper transportation. Thus, not only is LOX crucial to cardiovascular development, it is thought to play a major role in connective tissue development and may also be important in neurological function.

Lysyl oxidase has also proven crucial to the development of the respiratory system and the skin, as collagen and elastin represent 50-60% of the composition of the lung, and 75% of the skin. In LOX double knockout models (Lox -/-), function of LOX was reduced by up to 80%, and the phenotype of the lungs resembles those of human patients with emphysema and dilated distal airways.

Finally, lysyl oxidase plays a crucial role in the commitment step of adipocyte, or fat cell, formation from pluripotent stem cells during development. Its absence may lead to defects in the transforming growth factor beta superfamily of proteins, which control cell growth and differentiation.

Clinical significance 

LOX expression is regulated by hypoxia-inducible factors (HIFs), and, hence, LOX expression is often upregulated in hypoxic breast and head and neck tumors. Patients with high LOX-expressing tumors have poor overall survival. Furthermore, inhibition of LOX has been demonstrated to eliminate metastases in mice. Secreted LOX is responsible for the invasive properties of hypoxic cancer cells through focal adhesion kinase activity and cell-to-matrix adhesion. LOX may be required to create a niche permissive for metastatic growth and, thus, may be required for hypoxia-induced metastasis. In fact, recent research has shown overexpression of LOX as crucial to promoting tumor growth and metastasis in several cancers, including breast cancer, non-small cell lung cancer, and colorectal cancer.

LOX expression was also detected in megakaryocytes, or bone marrow cells responsible for the production of platelets. Data derived from  a mouse model of myelofibrosis implicated LOX in bone marrow fibrosis.

In a rodent model of breast cancer, a small-molecule or antibody inhibitors of LOX abolished metastasis. LOX secreted by hypoxic breast tumor cells crosslinks collagen in the basement membrane and is essential for CD11b+ myeloid cell recruitment. CD11b+ cells in turn adhere to crosslinked collagen and produce matrix metalloproteinase-2, which cleaves collagen, enhancing the invasion of metastasizing tumor cells. In contrast, LOX inhibition prevents CD11b+ cell recruitment and metastatic growth.

In cells lacking TGF-β receptors, a deficiency that is characteristic of lung cancer, lysyl oxidase is found in high concentrations. LOX immunostaining has revealed that high LOX expression is associated with high extent of carcinoma invasion in samples obtained from surgically removed lung adenocarcinomas. Additionally, LOX expression is an indicator of 5-year survival in patients, with a 71% chance of survival for patients with low LOX levels, compared to 43% for patients with high LOX levels. Thus, upregulation of lysyl oxidase is a predictor of poor prognosis in early-stage adenocarcinoma patients.

Lysyl oxidase has been newly implicated in tumor angiogenesis, or blood vessel formation, both in vivo and in vitro. Subcutaneous tumor-derived LOX was shown to increase vascular endothelial growth factor (VEGF) expression and secretion, which then promotes angiogenesis by phosphorylation of protein kinase B, or Akt, through platelet-derived growth factor receptor β (PDGFRB). High levels of LOX were associated with high blood vessel density in patient samples. Clinically relevant LOX inhibitors may help slow cancer progression by downregulating crucial growth factors that promote solid tumor progression.

Hence, inhibitors of the LOX enzyme may be useful in preventing angiogenesis, tumor progression, and metastasis as well as treating other fibrotic disease involving remodeling of the extracellular matrix, including neurodegenerative and cardiovascular diseases.

See also 
 LOXL1
 LOXL2
 LOXL3
 LOXL4
 Menkes disease
 Occipital horn syndrome

References

Further reading

External links 
 

 
Copper enzymes